Pidurutalagala (pronounced , Straw Plateau Rock), or Mount Pedro in English, is an ultra prominent peak and the tallest mountain in Sri Lanka, at .  It is situated North-North-East from the town of Nuwara Eliya and is easily visible from most areas of the Central Province. Its summit is home to the central communications array of the Government of Sri Lanka and armed forces and serves as an important point in the country's radar system. The peak is currently designated as an "Ultra-high security zone", and is protected by a large military base; the peak is strictly off-limits to the general public.

On 1 March 2010, a small wildfire broke out over the mountain's forest cover. The fire destroyed  of forest, before being doused by the Sri Lanka Air Force and nearly 300 local residents.

See also 
 Geography of Sri Lanka
 List of mountains of Sri Lanka
 Extreme points of Sri Lanka
 List of elevation extremes by country

References 

Mountains of Sri Lanka
Landforms of Central Province, Sri Lanka
Nuwara Eliya
Two-thousanders of Asia
Highest points of countries
Geography of Nuwara Eliya District